IPL Supernovas were an Indian cricket team. They were founded in 2018 to compete in the Women's T20 Challenge, which they competed in until the tournament ended in 2022. They were the most successful T20 Challenge side, having won the tournament three times, in 2018, 2019 and 2022.

History

2018
Supernovas were formed in 2018 to take part in the inaugural Women's T20 Challenge competition, in which they played a one-off match against Trailblazers. The game was viewed as a response to the men's Indian Premier League, and hopes were that the one-off game would lead towards a fully-fledged tournament in the future. Indian batter Harmanpreet Kaur was named as captain of the side, alongside fellow Indians Mithali Raj and Veda Krishnamurthy as well as overseas players Danni Wyatt, Sophie Devine, Ellyse Perry, Meg Lanning and Megan Schutt. 

In the match, which took place on 22 May 2018, the Supernovas won the toss and elected to bat first. Economical bowling restricted the Trailblazers to 129/6, with Schutt and Perry the picks of the bowlers, with 2 wickets apiece. Contributions from Mithali Raj, Wyatt and Harmanpreet Kaur got the Supernovas close in response, before Perry hit the winning runs off the final ball in a tense finish. The Supernovas were therefore crowned the winners of the inaugural Women's T20 Challenge.

2019
2019 saw the expansion of the tournament to three teams, with the addition of Velocity. Each side played each other once in a group stage, with the top two progressing to a final. In the first game, a rematch of last year's final against Trailblazers, the Supernovas lost by 2 runs after opposition opener Smriti Mandhana hit 90 off 67 balls. In their second game, however, 77 from Jemimah Rodrigues saw Supernovas post 142/3 against Velocity. Tight bowling from Poonam Yadav (4/13) then helped Supernovas to a 12 run victory, sending them through to the final. 

In the final, they faced Velocity again. Velocity batted first and posted 121/6, with Supernovas bowler Lea Tahuhu taking 2/21 from 4 overs, including a wicket maiden. 51 from Harmanpreet Kaur then set up a Supernovas victory, which again came off the final ball of the match, hit for four by Radha Yadav.

2020
The 2020 Women's T20 Challenge was delayed due to the COVID-19 pandemic, eventually getting underway in November. Supernovas played Velocity in their first match, losing by 5 wickets with one ball to spare. Newly signed overseas player Chamari Atapattu hit 44 for Supernovas.  In their second game, Atapattu was again the star, hitting 67 as the side scored 146/6 batting first. Radha Yadav then defended 9 off the final over to send her side into the final. 

Supernovas faced Trailblazers again in the final, with the Trailblazers batting first and scoring 118/8 from their 20 overs. The Supernovas struggled to chase, however, losing out by 16 runs.

2022
The 2022 Women's T20 Challenge took place in May 2022. Supernovas won the opening game of the tournament by 49 runs, against Trailblazers, with Pooja Vastrakar taking 4/12 from her four overs. They lost their second match, against Velocity, by 7 wickets, but still qualified for the final on Net Run Rate. They faced Velocity again in the final, and scored 165/7 batting first, with Deandra Dottin scoring 62 from 44 balls. They then restricted Velocity to 161/8 to win their third T20 Challenge title.

The 2022 season proved to be the final edition of the Women's T20 Challenge, with the tournament being replaced by the Women's Premier League from the 2023 season.

Players
Final squad, 2022 season. 
 No. denotes the player's squad number, as worn on the back of their shirt.
  denotes players with international caps.

Overseas players

Seasons

Women's T20 Challenge

Statistics

Women's T20 Challenge

References

Women's T20 Challenge teams